Lorraine is a British breakfast television programme that is broadcast on ITV. Launched on 6 September 2010, it is presented by Lorraine Kelly and in her absence by relief presenters Christine Lampard or Ranvir Singh and broadcasts live every weekday from 9:00am to 10:00am. The programme features a variety of showbiz, fashion, health, food, celebrity interviews and competitions.

The programme's run-time crosses the 9.25am ending of the official ITV Breakfast slot (6am-9.25am), which is wholly owned by ITV plc. This is why viewers in most of Scotland see ITV1 branding surrounding the first 25 minutes of the show, and STV branding for the remainder of the time slot.

Format
Each day the presenter gives an introduction into what's coming up on the show, before discussing the main stories from the morning's newspapers, although sometimes this is replaced by a Los Angeles update from Ross King. The show's first guests tend to be interviewed next. Throughout the show more guests are interviewed as well as regulars such as Mark Heyes and Dr. Hilary Jones appear with fashion and health slots, respectively. The competition that runs on Good Morning Britain also appears throughout the show.

According to Attitude, Lorraine has "provided a platform for LGBT people to share their stories" and it earned Kelly the "Honourary Gay Award" at the 2015 Attitude Awards. The magazine described Lorraine as "one of the campest things on telly". Kelly described the series as "quite gay every day".

History
On 6 September 2010, the first edition of the programme aired. A preview on Daybreak revealed the new studio look as spacious and coloured in a variety of pastel hues and decorative motifs dominated by pink. The sofa for the presenter and guests was pink and arranged in a semicircle around a central internally lit coffee table similar to that used for Daybreak. Lorraine's first guest was actress Gemma Arterton. The first programme also featured an interview with Sky News reporter Sarah Parish and a recipe by TV chef James Tanner while Celia Walden and Kevin Maguire reviewed the morning's newspapers.

On 20 October 2014, the programme was briefly taken off air after a fire alarm forced its occupants to evacuate the studio on London's South Bank. Kelly was about to interview eliminated X Factor contestant Stephanie Nala from Luminites when they were interrupted by the alarm at 9:10am. A spokeswoman for Lorraine said: "An alarm was raised within ITV this morning and the area was immediately evacuated. Once it had been investigated and deemed safe, people were able to re-enter the building." Lorraine Kelly wrote to fans on Twitter: "So sorry. We had to evacuate the building. First time in 30 years!" The show didn't make it back onto the air and the last 15 minutes was replaced by an episode of The National Trust and then followed by The Jeremy Kyle Show as normal.

In February 2016, Lorraine's Top Tales was launched, a competition to find new children's author with Nadiya Hussain and Tom Fletcher as judges.

In April 2018, and along with the rest of ITV Breakfast, Lorraine began broadcasting from BBC Studioworks' Television Centre. The move was as a result of the proposed redevelopment of The London Studios; however in October 2018, it was announced that ITV would not be returning to the South Bank.

On 6 January 2020, the show moved to a new time slot from 9:00am to 10:00am, with Good Morning Britain and This Morning both extended by 30 minutes.

Production on Lorraine was suspended from 23 March to 10 July 2020 due to the COVID-19 pandemic. Good Morning Britain was extended to 10am, with the final hour presented by Kelly and titled Good Morning Britain with Lorraine.

Presenters

Crossovers

Daybreak

On ITV's previous breakfast show, Daybreak, there was a preview of the day's edition of Lorraine on each day at around 07:30 with a chat between the programmes' hosts prior to a handover at 08:30. This preview was originally shown at 08:15 but was moved to an earlier slot in March 2011. On 30 November 2010, Daybreak co-presenter Adrian Chiles wore a kilt and made an on-screen visit to the Lorraine studio to congratulate Lorraine Kelly on her birthday and mark St Andrew's Day. On 20 July 2011, Lorraine was presented from the Daybreak studio due to technical problems.

Good Morning Britain

After Daybreak ended on 25 April 2014, its replacement Good Morning Britain began the following Monday (28 April 2014), as a result Lorraine now follows Good Morning Britain. Each day there is a preview of the Lorraine show on Good Morning Britain at 8:15am (after the regional news bulletin opt out). In March 2020 – July 2020 Lorraine hosted in the final hour of GMB (9.00-10.00) due to her program being suspended due to the COVID-19 Pandemic. The final hour was renamed GMB with Lorraine.

Logo gallery
The programme has had five different logos since it began airing in 2010.

References

External links

2010 British television series debuts
2010s British LGBT-related television series
2020s British LGBT-related television series
2010s British television series
2020s British television series
Breakfast television in the United Kingdom
English-language television shows
ITV Breakfast
ITV (TV network) original programming
Television productions suspended due to the COVID-19 pandemic
Television series by ITV Studios